Ford Company may refer to:

Ford Motor Company, founded in 1903 by Henry Ford
Henry Ford Company, founded in 1901 by Henry Ford